Thomas Ledgerwood (15 February 1923 – 13 February 2006) was a professional footballer who played for Partick Thistle and Greenock Morton in the Scottish Football League.

He made a total of 338 appearances for Partick in all competitions and scored one goal – after being injured against Heart of Midlothian and placed on the wing he soon scored a goal to halve a 3–1 deficit, with his team going on to win 5–4. He won the Glasgow Cup on two occasions and appeared in three Scottish League Cup finals, but finished on the losing side each time.

At representative level, Ledgerwood was selected once each for the Scottish Football League XI and the Scotland B team, both in 1952.

See also
 List of goalscoring goalkeepers

References

External links

1923 births
2006 deaths
Scottish footballers
Coldstream F.C. players
Partick Thistle F.C. players
Greenock Morton F.C. players
Scottish Football League players
Association football goalkeepers
Scotland B international footballers
Sportspeople from the Scottish Borders
Scottish Football League representative players